Peter Joseph McKenna (8 December 1901–1964) was an English footballer who played in the Football League for Chelsea and Southend United.

References

1901 births
1964 deaths
English footballers
Association football goalkeepers
English Football League players
Bangor City F.C. players
Chelsea F.C. players
Southend United F.C. players
People from Toxteth
Footballers from Liverpool